Giuseppe is the Italian form of the given name Joseph,
from Latin Iōsēphus from Ancient Greek Ἰωσήφ (Iōsḗph), from Hebrew יוסף.
It is the most common name in Italy and is unique (97%) to it. 
The feminine form of the name is Giuseppina.

People with the given name

Artists and musicians
 Giuseppe Aldrovandini (1671–1707), Italian composer
 Giuseppe Arcimboldo (1526 or 1527–1593), Italian painter
 Giuseppe Belli (singer) (1732–1760), Italian castrato singer
 Giuseppe Gioachino Belli (1791–1863), Italian poet
 Giuseppe Castiglione (1829–1908) (1829–1908), Italian painter
 Giuseppe Giordani (1751–1798), Italian composer, mainly of opera
 Giuseppe Ottaviani (born 1978), Italian musician and disc jockey
 Giuseppe Psaila (1891–1960), Maltese Art Nouveau architect
 Giuseppe Sammartini (1695–1750), Italian composer and oboist
 Giuseppe Sanmartino or Sammartino (1720–1793), Italian sculptor
 Giuseppe Santomaso (1907–1990), Italian painter
 Giuseppe Tartini (1692–1770), Venetian composer and violinist
 Giuseppe Tornatore (born 1956), Italian film director and screenwriter
 Giuseppe Valenti (19th century), Italian sculptor
 Giuseppe Verdi (1813–1901), Italian opera composer

Politicians
 Giuseppe Bastianini (1899–1961), Italian politician and diplomat
 Giuseppe Belluzzo (1876–1952), Italian scholar and politician
 Giuseppe Castiglione (politician) (born 1963),Italian politician
 Giuseppe Garibaldi (1807–1882), Italian general, politician and nationalist
 Giuseppe Gorla (1895–1979), Italian engineer and politician 
 Giuseppe Guarino (1922–2020), Italian scholar and politician
 Giuseppe L'Abbate (born 1985), Italian politician
 Giuseppe Lupis (1896–1979), Italian journalist and politician
 Giuseppe Mazzini (1805–1872), Italian politician, journalist and activist for the unification of Italy
 Giuseppe Medici (1907–2000), Italian politician and economist
 Giuseppe Micheli (1874–1948), Italian politician
 Giuseppe Moles (born 1967), Italian politician
 Giuseppe Tatarella (1935–1999), Italian politician
 Giuseppe Trabucchi (1904–1975), Italian lawyer and politician
 Giuseppe Zamberletti (1933–2019), Italian politician

Sportsmen
 Giuseppe Baresi (born 1958), Italian football manager and former player
 Giuseppe Bergomi (born 1963), Italian retired footballer
 Giuseppe Farina (1906-1966), Italian racing driver and first official Formula One World Champion (1950)
 Giuseppe Favalli (born 1972), Italian former footballer
 Giuseppe Meazza (1910–1979), Italian football manager and player
 Giuseppe Micheli, Italian modern pentathlete
 Giuseppe Ottaviani (athlete) (1916–2020), Italian athlete
 Giuseppe Signori (born 1968), Italian retired footballer

Others
  Giuseppe Balsamo (1743–1795), real name of occultist Alessandro Cagliostro
 Giuseppe Bertello (born 1942), Italian Catholic prelate and cardinal
 Giuseppe Botero (1815–1885), Italian writer and educator
 Giuseppe Baudoin (1843–1896), Italian major
 Giuseppe Castiglione (Jesuit painter) (1688–1766), Italian Jesuit Brother, missionary and court painter in China
 Giuseppe Colombo (1920–1984), Italian scientist
 Giuseppe Marco Fieschi (1790–1836), chief conspirator in an attempt on the life of King Louis-Philippe of France
 Giuseppe Frazzetto (born 1955), art critic, philosopher and Professor of History of Art
 Giuseppe Gené (1800–1847), Italian naturalist and author
 Giuseppe Greco (1952–1985), Italian mobster and hitman
 Giuseppe Guarneri (1698–1744), Italian luthier
 Joe Masseria (1886–1931), Italian-born American mob boss
 Giuseppe Morello (1867–1930), Italian-born American mob boss
 Giuseppe Moscati (1880–1927), Italian doctor, scientific researcher, university professor and Catholic saint
 Giuseppe Peano (1858–1932), Italian mathematician
 Giuseppe Pennella (1864–1925), Italian general
 Joseph Petrosino (1860–1909), New York City police officer and pioneer in the fight against organized crime
 Giuseppe Piazzi (1746–1826), Italian Catholic priest, mathematician and astronomer
 Joe Profaci (1897–1962), born Giuseppe Profaci, Italian-American mob boss, longtime head of one of New York City's Five Families
 Giuseppe Siri (1906–1989), Italian Catholic cardinal and Archbishop of Genoa
 Giuseppe Tomasi di Lampedusa (1896–1957), Italian writer and last Prince of Lampedusa
 Giuseppe Zangara (1900–1933), Italian immigrant to the United States who attempted to assassinate then-President-elect Franklin D. Roosevelt

See also
 Beppe, Bepi and Beppo, diminutive forms of Giuseppe
 Di Giuseppe, an Italian surname meaning "son of Giuseppe"

References

Italian masculine given names
Sammarinese given names